Goritsy is a rural locality (a selo) in Novoalexandrovskoye Rural Settlement, Suzdalsky District, Vladimir Oblast, Russia. The population was 10 as of 2010. There are 9 streets.

Geography 
Goritsy is located 44 km south of Suzdal (the district's administrative centre) by road. Zeleni is the nearest rural locality.

References 

Rural localities in Suzdalsky District